Kemal Aksur (29 October 1923 – 29 September 2001) was a Turkish sprinter. He competed in the men's 100 metres at the 1948 Summer Olympics.

References

1923 births
2001 deaths
Athletes (track and field) at the 1948 Summer Olympics
Turkish male sprinters
Olympic athletes of Turkey
Sportspeople from Istanbul
20th-century Turkish people